The Crimson Route was a set of joint United States and Canada transport routes planned for ferrying planes and material from North America to Europe during World War II.  The project was ended in 1943 and never fully developed.

Overview
The 1940 fall of France and the Battle of Britain alarmed Americans who feared that Great Britain might also fall, bringing the Axis one step closer to the United States. Eschewing direct involvement in the war, in 1940, the United States concentrated on "hemisphere defense" and began planning for airfields and air routes in the Arctic. With the fall of Denmark in April, Greenland came under U.S. protection, and an inconclusive survey for airfields was made there that summer.

With the passage of the Lend-Lease act in March 1941, large numbers of American-built aircraft were to be ferried to the United Kingdom.   Joint American-British-Canadian-Free Danish efforts resulted in airfields being built or expanded on Newfoundland (Argentia, Gander, Stephenville, St. John's, and Torbay), in Labrador (Goose Bay), and by that summer, Greenland (Bluie West One). The British field in Reykjavík, Iceland, was expanded and supplemented by the American built airfield at Keflavík.

Because of the urgency of the situation and heavy losses at sea, interest developed in creating an alternate air ferry route further north. It would have better weather conditions and would be on a great-circle route from the aircraft factories on the west coast. It could also serve as overflow or alternate destinations for air traffic on the southern route. For this purpose the Crystal stations (Fort Chimo, Frobisher Bay, and Padloping Island) were surveyed and begun in northern Quebec and Baffin Island. That October, the important airport at Bluie West Eight (Sondrestrom) was founded in Greenland.

During the Argentia conference in August, USAAF Captain Elliott Roosevelt (who had surveyed the Crystal stations) briefed the top decisionmakers on the concept for the alternate route, which was accepted and given high priority. The network was now extended to include Crimson West, extending from Edmonton to Frobisher, and Crimson East, which used new bases east of Hudson Bay.
 
This meant that the aircraft could be flown across the United States and Canada, where they would then be flown across the North Atlantic via Greenland and Iceland, never exceeding about 700 nautical miles in needed range.

A much shorter route from Southern California could be used by flying a Great Circle Route north through central and northern Canada from Southern California, the distance to Iceland might be cut by almost 600 miles.  It was expected that much more favourable flying weather would be found than in Northeastern North America, that valuable experience with Arctic conditions of flight would be acquired, and that the experiment might lead to the development of a shorter airway into Russia (see: Northwest Staging Route).

In practice, the northern alternate route would suffer from extended darkness and extreme cold in winter, and difficult resupply and sparse infrastructure in summer. With the greater success of the southern route and the defeat of the U-boats in 1943, the Crimson concept fell into disfavor, but not until the fields and considerable support facilities had been constructed.

Planned routes

First referred to as the "North East Staging Route" it eventually became known as the "Crimson Project" or "Crimson Route",  with Crimson being the code-name for Canada. [Many have suggested that the Crimson moniker referred to the sanguinary expectation of a back-flow of killed and wounded from Europe. However, while this was expected and base hospitals built on many fields, it does not account for the name.]  The project came under the jurisdiction of the Air Transport Command North Atlantic Division.  Originally there were to be three routes making up the Crimson Route: Eastern, Western and Central.

Eastern route 

This route was referred to by the American military as the "North Atlantic Ferrying" or "Staging Route."

Central route 

Most of the Canadian airfields were newly and expressly constructed for the purpose of the Crimson Route.

Western route 

This was the route that the American military directly referred to using the term Crimson Route.

History
A directive issued by the United States Chief of Staff on 24 May 1942 ordered construction of landing strips at The Pas and Churchill in Manitoba, at Coral Harbour Southampton Island on Hudson Bay, along with weather stations and runways at Fort Chimo Quebec (CRYSTAL I), on Frobisher Bay (CRYSTAL II), and on Padloping Island (CRYSTAL III)  to begin during the summer of 1942.

The project received a severe setback in late summer (27 August 1942) when an enemy U-boat operating off the Labrador coast sank a ship carrying some 6,000 tons of cargo, including vital construction equipment intended for use at CRYSTAL I, CRYSTAL II, and Coral Harbour on Southampton Island Hudson Bay.

The winter of 1942-43 presented major problems all along the North Atlantic Transport Route. A high accident rate due to weather was experienced beginning in September 1942 and it continued to climb. On 22 November Air Transport Command suspended the transportation of passengers across the North Atlantic for the duration of the winter. The operation of two-engine transports beyond Iceland already had been forbidden. Some ferrying, chiefly of long-range aircraft, continued into December, as did the transport operations of C-54 Skymasters and C-87 Liberators under contract with TWA and American Airlines, but by mid-December the North Atlantic Transport Route had been virtually closed down for the winter

ATC traffic to Great Britain was diverted to the South Atlantic Transport Route. The distance to Britain by this route was double that of the projected CRIMSON route, but distance dis-advantage was eclipsed by the fact that operations that could be maintained on a year-round basis.

Efforts on another front were also productive. Prior to 1943 the Portuguese government only allowed German U-boats and navy ships to refuel in the Azores. However diplomatic efforts in 1943 persuaded Portuguese dictator Salazar to lease bases on Azores Islands to the British. This represented a change in policy and was a key turning point in the Battle of the Atlantic  allowing the Allies to provide aerial coverage in the middle of the Atlantic. This helped allies to hunt U-boats, protect vital convoys and support mid-Atlantic Air Transport Command ferry efforts.

This new prospect in 1943 that a transatlantic route through the Azores would soon be possible brought the expensive and unlucky CRIMSON ROUTE project to an early end.  On the recommendation of ATC, the Army Air Force in the spring of 1944 abandoned the airfields at The Pas, Churchill and Southampton Island while those at the CRYSTALS and Mingan were reduced to emergency status. Save for five RAF planes which followed the CRIMSON routes to the United Kingdom in the summer of 1943, virtually no other use was of the route by either ferried or transport United States aircraft.

See also 

 North Atlantic air ferry route in World War II
 South Atlantic air ferry route in World War II
 South Pacific air ferry route in World War II
 West Coast Wing (Air Transport Command route to Alaska)
 Northwest Staging Route

References

Crystal two: The origin of Iqaluit by Robert V. Eno

Military history of Canada during World War II

Military history of the United States during World War II
Aircraft ferrying